The Baddest III is a compilation released by Japanese singer Toshinobu Kubota, on December 4, 2002. The album charted at number 3 on the Oricon Weekly Albums chart and stay on the charts for a total of eighteen weeks. The album also sold over 316,000 units in Japan.

Track listing
La La La Love Song (featuring Naomi Campbell)
The Sound of Carnival (Brand New Mix)
Nice & EZ
Cymbals
Candy Rain
Soul Bangin'
Ahhhhh! (Northern Lights Version)
What's The Wonder?
What Are You Looking At?
Always Remain
Summer Eyes
Never Turn Back (featuring Pras)
Messengers' Rhyme (Rakushow, It's Your Show!) (The Baddest Bottom Mix) 
Polyrhythm
Yoru Ni Dakarete (A Night In Afro Blue)
Free Your Soul (KC's Bee-Mellow Remix)

Charts

Oricon Sales Chart

References

2002 compilation albums
Toshinobu Kubota albums